Systems Limited (SYS) is a Pakistani public technology company, involved in mortgage, apparel, retail and BPO services. Systems is the parent company of the Techvista Systems (United Arab Emirates), Systems Arabia (Saudi Arabia), Systems Misr (Egypt) and Techvista Qatar (Qatar), NdcTech. It has a market value of around US$ 620 million (PKR 140.77 billion ) as of late-2022.

History 
Systems Limited was established in 1977. The company is Pakistan's first software house.

The company began its operations in the United States in 1997 and then in the United Arab Emirates in 2013. In the same year, Asif Peer was appointed as the CEO of Systems. The Company where he started his career as Software Developer in 1996. The company went public with an initial public offering (IPO) on December 4, 2014 and is now one of the largest IT exporters listed on the Pakistan Stock Exchange. 13 million shares were listed on the Karachi, Islamabad, and Lahore stock exchanges. In 2020, the company was the top performer in tech stocks, despite the COVID-19 pandemic. In September 2021, the share price of Systems Ltd reached Rs. 740.93 and the company's market value became Rs. 102 billion, making Systems Ltd the first Pakistani IT company to cross-market value of PKR 100 billion.

In Aug 2022, Systems Limited created a new subsidiary in Johannesburg, South Africa, as part of its ongoing global expansion. It's Pakistan's first IT company in Africa.

Services 
Systems Limited operates in various areas such as digital consultancy, business applications, data management & analytics, cloud services, application development, application integration, security, IT infrastructure, user experience, cloud team, quality assurance, and application modernization. Additionally, Systems has a business process outsourcing (BPO) unit and teams of contact centre staff for their clients' front-office and back-office operations.

Awards and recognition 
In 2019, Systems was recognized by the Pakistan Software Export Board's IT Export Awards, receiving the Platinum Awards in Top IT Export 2019 and Top IT Consultancy Services Exporter. In 2020, the company was one of 200 companies internationally to be included in Forbes Asia's "Best Under a Billion" list. In light of its recognition by Forbes, Systems was awarded federal recognition by Pakistan's Federal Minister for Information Technology & Telecommunication,Syed Aminul Haque, and was also honored by the Pakistan Stock Exchange in an awards ceremony.

See also 
List of largest companies in Pakistan

References

External links
Techvista Systems
Systems Arabia
Techvista Qatar

Companies of Pakistan